Liverpool Football Club is an English association football club based in Liverpool, Merseyside. The club was formed in 1892 following a disagreement between the board of Everton and club president John Houlding, who owned the club's ground, Anfield. The disagreement between the two parties over rent resulted in Everton moving to Goodison Park from Anfield, which left Houlding with an empty stadium. Thus, he founded Liverpool F.C. to play in the empty stadium. Liverpool won the First Division title for the first time in 1901; since then, the club has won a further 17 league titles, along with seven FA Cups and nine League Cups. They have also been crowned champions of European football on six occasions by winning the European Cup/UEFA Champions League in 1977, 1978, 1981, 1984, 2005 and 2019. The club was one of 22 members of the Premier League when it was formed in 1992. They experienced the most successful period in their history under the management of Bob Paisley, who guided the team to 21 trophies in nine seasons.

Since playing their first match, more than 700 players have appeared in competitive first-team matches for the club, many of whom have played between 25 and 99 matches (including substitute appearances). Jim Beglin and Álvaro Arbeloa both made 98 appearances for the club, before an injury to Beglin and Arbeloa's sale to Real Madrid ended their Liverpool careers. Ned Doig who appeared 53 times for the club, is the oldest player to have played for Liverpool. He was 41 years and 165 days when he played against Newcastle United on 11 April 1908. Frank Becton, who made 86 appearances for Liverpool, was the first player from the club to represent his country, when he played for England in 1897.

208 players have played between 25 and 99 competitive matches for the club. Of those players, nine are still playing for the club and can add to their total.

Players
Appearances and goals are for first-team competitive matches only, including Premier League, Football League, FA Cup, Football League Cup, FA Charity/Community Shield, European Cup/UEFA Champions League, UEFA Cup/UEFA Europa League, UEFA Cup Winners' Cup, Inter-Cities Fairs Cup, UEFA Super Cup and FIFA Club World Cup matches; wartime matches are regarded as unofficial and are excluded, as are matches from the abandoned 1939–40 season.
Players are listed according to the date of their first-team debut for the club.
Positions are listed according to the tactical formations that were employed at the time. Thus the change in the names of defensive and midfield reflects the tactical evolution that occurred from the 1960s onwards.
Statistics correct .

Table headers
 Nationality – If a player played international football, the country/countries he played for are shown. Otherwise, the player's nationality is given as their country of birth.
 Liverpool career – The year of the player's first appearance for Liverpool to the year of his last appearance.
 Starts – The number of games started.
 Subs – The number of games played as a substitute. Substitutions were only introduced to the Football League in the 1960s.
 Total – The total number of games played, both as a starter and as a substitute.

Notes

References

External links
 

 
Liverpool
Players
Association football player non-biographical articles